Surfside may refer to:

Places 
United States
Surfside, California or Surfside Colony
Surfside, Florida
Surfside, Massachusetts
Surfside Beach, Texas
Surfside Beach, South Carolina

Other uses
 Surfside condominium building collapse in June 2021
 Surfside (horse), a racehorse
 Surfside Buslines, a public transport operator on the Gold Coast of Australia
 Surfside 6, a detective television series that aired on ABC from 1960 to 1962